Corunastylis laminata, commonly known as the red midge orchid, is a small terrestrial orchid endemic to New South Wales. It has a single thin leaf fused to the flowering stem and up to twenty bright reddish flowers. It grows in heath and grassy forest in a few places on the South Coast and Central Tablelands.

Description
As with others in the genus, the flowers are inverted so that the labellum is above the column rather than below it. There is sometimes a small gland on the tip of the lateral sepals. There is a broad, tapering callus in the centre of the labellum and extending nearly to its tip. Flowering occurs from January to May.

Taxonomy and naming
The red midge orchid was first formally described in 1885 by Robert D. FitzGerald who gave it the name Prasophyllum  laminatum and published the description in Journal of Botany, British and Foreign. In 2004, David Jones and Mark Clements changed the name to Corunastylis laminata. The specific epithet (laminata) is derived from the Latin word lamina meaning "a thin plate", "blade" or "sheet".

The World Checklist of Selected Plant Families lists C. laminata as a synonym of Genoplesium rufum.

Distribution and habitat
Corunastylis laminata grows in heathy or grassy forest between Jervis Bay and Bowral.

References

laminata
Endemic orchids of Australia
Orchids of New South Wales
Plants described in 1885